Nicholas Joanides (born June 17, 1970) is an American professional stock car racing driver who competes part-time in the ARCA Menards Series West, driving the No. 77 Toyota for Performance P-1 Motorsports. He has also competed in the NASCAR Xfinity Series (when it was the Nationwide Series), ARCA Menards Series East (when it was the NASCAR Busch East Series), and the now-defunct AutoZone Elite Division Southwest & Midwest Series in the past.

Racing career
In 2009, Joanides became the first driver in the history of Toyota Speedway at Irwindale to win championships in the top two premier divisions, and he did so in the same season. 2009 saw Joanides win the NASCAR AC-Delco Super Late Model Championship, NASCAR Auto Club Late Model Championship, NASCAR Whelen All-American Series California State Championship, and the Lucas Oil Slick Mist 200 Championship. He ended up third in the NASCAR All-American Series National standings. In total, Joanides competed in 42 races and scored 17 wins, 33 podiums, 37 top 5, and 41 top 10 finishes.

On October 17, Joanides announced that he would be joining Rick Ware Racing for his NASCAR Nationwide Series debut at Memphis Motorsports Park on October 24, 2009.

Joanides retired from full-time racing following the 2010 season. He came out of retirement late in 2015. Through the first 35 events, posted 15 wins and 26 top 5 finishes. In 2016, an engine failure in the third event of the 2016 season resulted in a 32 point loss. Joanides would go on to finish 2nd in the final point standings, 24 points shy of the championship.

Joanides returned to Performance P-1 Motorsports in 2018 for a part-time schedule in NASCAR K&N Pro Series West, scoring a top-5 finish at All American Speedway in Roseville, CA.

He returned to the team in 2021 for a one-race deal in the 4th of July weekend race at Irwindale Speedway, posting the teams only top-10 finish of the season.

Joanides had one scheduled start in 2022 for Performance P-1 Motorsports in the March Race at Irwindale. With no other race on his schedule, Joanides was called by team owner Lowden Motorsports late in the afternoon to fill in for their driver, who was suffering from food poisoning. Joanides arrived just before the race, with no practice, qualifying or power steering, brought home The Hard Charger award by passing the most cars in coming from last on the grid to finish 11th. Joanides is scheduled to compete in the final 3 ARCA West Series Races at Roseville, Vegas & Phoenix
On September 17th, 2022, Joanides entered his first Spears SRL Pro-Late Model Series race and came away with the win.

Motorsports career results

NASCAR
(key) (Bold – Pole position awarded by qualifying time. Italics – Pole position earned by points standings or practice time. * – Most laps led.)

Nationwide Series

Busch East Series

ARCA Menards Series
(key) (Bold – Pole position awarded by qualifying time. Italics – Pole position earned by points standings or practice time. * – Most laps led.)

ARCA Menards Series West

References

External links
 
 

Living people
1970 births
NASCAR drivers
ARCA Menards Series drivers
Racing drivers from California
Racing drivers from Los Angeles
People from Woodland Hills, Los Angeles